John Dowall (born 19 December 1965) is a Paralympic athlete from New Zealand competing mainly in category F44 throwing events.

John has twice competed in the Paralympics, first in 1996 and then again in 2000. In 1996 he took part in the discus, javelin, long jump and shot put. In 2000 he took part in discus, pentathlon, won silver in shot put and gold medal in javelin.

Personal life
Dowall lost his left leg below the knee in a lawnmower accident at the age of five. He is the father of the rugby league footballer Shaun Kenny-Dowall.

References

External links 
 
 

Paralympic athletes of New Zealand
Athletes (track and field) at the 1996 Summer Paralympics
Athletes (track and field) at the 2000 Summer Paralympics
Paralympic gold medalists for New Zealand
Paralympic silver medalists for New Zealand
Living people
Medalists at the 2000 Summer Paralympics
1965 births
Paralympic medalists in athletics (track and field)
New Zealand male javelin throwers
New Zealand male shot putters
Sportspeople from Hamilton, New Zealand
Javelin throwers with limb difference
Shot putters with limb difference
Paralympic javelin throwers
Paralympic shot putters